Ithytrichia is a genus of insects belonging to the family Hydroptilidae.

The species of this genus are found in Europe and America.

Species:
 Ithytrichia aquila Gonzalez & Malicky, 1988
 Ithytrichia bosniaca Murgoci, Botnariuec & Botosaneanu, 1948

References

Hydroptilidae
Trichoptera genera